Seonamhaeicola marinus is a Gram-negative, facultatively anaerobic, rod-shaped and non-motile bacterium from the genus of Seonamhaeicola which has been isolated from the algae Gracilaria blodgettii.

References

Flavobacteria
Bacteria described in 2017